Alberto Miguel Espina Otero (born 4 December 1956) is a Chilean lawyer and politician. 

He was Minister of Defense in the second government of the President Sebastián Piñera (2018–2022).

Biography
He is the son of Alberto Espina Barros and María Eliana Otero Lathrop (now deceased). Also Espina has three brothers: a doctor, another Minister of the Court of Appeals and another sister. Likewise, he is the nephew of Miguel Otero Lathrop, senator of Renovación Nacional ―RN; same party of Espina― for the 1990–1998 period.

He attended at The Grange School graduating from there in 1974. Then, he entered to Universidad de Chile's School of Law, being received with a degree in legal and social sciences in 1979. During his spell at the School of Law he was assistant of the Constitutional and Procedural Law departments as well as he was assistant professor of Procedural Law. Once received, Espina was professor of Criminal Law and Police Procedure at the Escuela de Carabineros de Chile.

Political career
He began his political activities as president of the Grange school student center, where he was student leader within the opposition to the Popular Unity (UP) government (1970–1973).

In 1983, he was founding member of Movimiento de Unión Nacional (MUN), movement which signed the National Agreement for the Transition to Full Democracy. In 1987, his movement merged into the RN party, organization where Espina was founder, regional president of the (Metropolitan Region), political commission member, Vice-president and national president. 

In 1989, he was elected deputy (1990–1994) for the communes of Ñuñoa and Providencia, being reelected with the first majority in 1993 and 1997 for the periods 1994–1998 and 1998–2002. In 1999, he was a member of the Central Command of the Presidential Candidacy of Joaquín Lavín (UDI) during 1999–00 presidential election. 

In 2001, he was elected Senator for the period 2002–2010. In 2005, he was the political head of the Presidential Candidacy of his partymate Sebastián Piñera, who now faced Lavín. In 2009, he was reelected senator for the period 2010–2018.

On 6 November 2020, it was reported by El Líbero that Espina was appointed by Piñera as counsellor of State of Chile's Defense Council.

References

External links
 

1956 births
People from Santiago
Living people
National Renewal (Chile) politicians
Movimiento de Unión Nacional politicians
University of Chile alumni
20th-century Chilean politicians
21st-century Chilean politicians
Chilean Ministers of Defense